Radio Nights is an album released in 1991 featuring previously unreleased live radio broadcasts by the Cannonball Adderley Quartet, Quintet and Sextet from New York City's Half Note Club jazz club. They were recorded by Alan Grant and broadcast live on radio in the last week of 1967 and the first week of 1968. The montage of Adderley's monologues are taken from a recording made at the Keystone Korner jazz club, San Francisco. At the time of the recordings, Adderley was under contract to Capitol.

Reception

The Penguin Guide to Jazz described it as "a well-travelled private recording from the Half Note, entertaining but slightly mechanical". The AllMusic reviewer suggested that the album was better than Adderley's official Capitol releases from the same time.

Track listing 

"The Little Boy With The Sad Eyes" (Nat Adderley) 
"Midnight Mood" (Josef Zawinul, Ben Raleigh)
"Stars Fell On Alabama" (Frank Perkins, Mitchell Parish) 6:32
"Fiddler On The Roof" (Jerry Bock, Sheldon Harnick)
"Work Song" (Nat Adderley) 
"The Song My Lady Sings" (Charles Lloyd) 
"Unit Seven" (Sam Jones)
Cannonball Monologues on: i. "Oh Babe" (Nat Adderley, Julian Adderley)ii. "Country Preacher" (Joe Zawinul)

Personnel
"Stars Fell On Alabama"
Julian "Cannonball" Adderley - alto saxophone
Joe Zawinul - piano
Sam Jones - bass
Roy McCurdy - drums

"The Little Boy With The Sad Eyes", "Midnight Mood", "Fiddler On The Roof" 
Julian "Cannonball" Adderley - alto saxophone
Nat Adderley - cornet
Joe Zawinul - piano
Sam Jones - bass
Roy McCurdy - drums

"Work Song", "The Song My Lady Sings", "Unit Seven"
Julian "Cannonball" Adderley - alto saxophone
Nat Adderley - cornet
Charles Lloyd - tenor saxophone
Joe Zawinul - keyboards
Sam Jones - bass
Louis Hayes - drums

References

1991 live albums
Cannonball Adderley live albums
Albums produced by Joel Dorn